Domokos, the ancient Thaumacus or Thaumace (Θαυμακός, Θαυμάκη), is a town and a municipality in Phthiotis, Greece. The town Domokos is the seat of the municipality of Domokos and of the former Domokos Province. The town is built on a mountain slope overlooking the plain of Thessaly, 38 km from the city of Lamia.

History

Ancient

Modern
The area of Domokos became part of Greece in 1881 when the Ottoman Empire ceded Thessaly and a few adjacent areas to Greece. Until 1899, it was part of the Larissa Prefecture.

Ottoman Era 
In 1521 (Hijri 927) the town of "Dömeke" had 6 Muslim households and 311 Christian households in 9 neighbourhoods.

Battle of Domokos
In 1897, during the Greco-Turkish War, about 2,000 Italian volunteers under the command of Giuseppe Garibaldi's son, Ricciotti Garibaldi, helped the Greeks in the Battle of Domokos. Among them there was also a member of the Italian Parliament, Antonio Fratti, who died in the fighting. The Turkish Army was victorious over the Greek Army.

Transport
The town is served by Domokos railway station on the Piraeus–Platy Mainline, which is located 5 km from the city and serves the surrounding area.

You can also visit the town via frequent buses that pass by the town.

Municipality 
The municipality Domokos was formed during the 2011 local government reforms by the merger of the following 3 former municipalities, that became municipal units:
Domokos 
Thessaliotida
Xyniada

The municipality has an area of 707.953 km2, the municipal unit 346.129 km2.

Province
The province of Domokos was one of the provinces of Phthiotis. It had the same territory as the present municipality. It was abolished in 2006.

References

External links
 Municipality of Domokos 

Municipalities of Central Greece
Populated places in Phthiotis
Provinces of Greece
Catholic titular sees in Europe